Beulah is a village in southern Powys, Wales, in the community of Treflys, lying on the Afon Cammarch. The village sits astride the main A483 road about 8 miles south-west of Builth Wells and is 49 miles (79 km) from Cardiff and 154 miles (248 km) from London.

It benefits from both a pub and service station with attached shop. The parish church Eglwys Oen Duw ("Lamb of God"), built in 1867, can be found 1 mile to the north-west of the village.

References

External links

Villages in Powys